Bakhtabad (also Romanized as Bakhtābād) is a village in Bizaki Rural District, Golbajar District, Chenaran County, Razavi Khorasan Province, Iran. At the 2006 census, its population was 19, in 4 families.

See also 

 List of cities, towns and villages in Razavi Khorasan Province

References 

Populated places in Chenaran County